Delay or DeLay may refer to:

People 
 B. H. DeLay (1891–1923), American aviator and movie stunt pilot
 Dorothy DeLay (1917–2002), American violin instructor
 Florence Delay (born 1941), French academician and actor
 Jan Delay, stage name of German musician Jan Phillip Eißfeldt (born 1976)
 Jason Delay (born 1995), American baseball player
 Jean Delay (1907–1987), French psychiatrist, neurologist, and writer
 Paul deLay (1952–2007), American blues musician
 Tom DeLay (born 1947), American politician
 Tom Delay (businessman) (born 1959), British businessman
 Vladislav Delay (born 1976), Finnish musician

Other uses
 Delay (audio effect), a technology for producing delayed playback of an audio signal
 Delay (programming), a programming language construct for delaying evaluation of an expression
 Delay 1968 or Delay, a 1981 compilation album by German experimental rock band Can
 The Delay, a 2012 Uruguayan film

See also 

 Delays, an English indie band
 Delaye